Stürmer may refer to:

 Der Stürmer, Nazi newspaper published from 1923 to 1945.

People named Stürmer (Stuermer) 
 Bartholomäus von Stürmer (1787–1863), Austrian diplomat
 Boris Stürmer (1848–1917), prime minister of Russia during several months in 1916
 Christina Stürmer (b. 1982), Austrian pop singer
 Daryl Stuermer (b. 1952), American musician
 Marcel Stürmer (born 1985), Brazilian artistic roller skater
 Michael Stürmer (b. 1938), German historian